The name Katring has been used for five tropical cyclones in the Philippines by PAGASA in the Western Pacific Ocean.

 Typhoon Wayne (1983) (T8304, 04W, Katring), which struck the Philippines and China
 Typhoon Thelma (1987) (T8705, 05W, Katring), which struck South Korea as a Category 1 typhoon
 Typhoon Teresa (1994) (T9430, 34W, Katring), which struck the Philippines and Vietnam
 Tropical Storm Sonamu (2006) (T0611, 12W, Katring)
 Typhoon Chaba (2010) (T1014, 16W, Katring) – approached Japan

The name Katring was retired after the 2010 typhoon season and replaced with Karding.

Pacific typhoon set index articles